Yanis Lenne (born 29 June 1996) is a French handball player who plays for Montpellier Handball and the French national handball team.

He participated in the 2021 World Championship.
He is the older brother of fellow Montpellier player Arthur Lenne.

References

External links

1996 births
Living people
Sportspeople from Colmar
French male handball players
Expatriate handball players
French expatriate sportspeople in Spain
FC Barcelona Handbol players
Liga ASOBAL players
Montpellier Handball players